Per Gade (born 24 August 1977) is a former Danish football player, who played as a defender. His preferred field position is as a right defender. He started his career with youth football in Nibe Boldklub, before he joined the Superliga team Aalborg BK, but never broke into the first team due to injuries. He moved to lower-league team FC Nordjylland in 2000, and when the club went bankrupt, he joined AC Horsens in the summer of 2004.

Honours
Danish Cup:
Runner-up: 1999–2000 (with AaB)
Danish 1st Division:
Runner-up: 2004–05 (with Horsens)
Danish 2nd Division:
Winner: 2002–03 (with Nordjylland)

External links
AC Horsens profile
 AaB profile
Career statistics at Danmarks Radio

Living people
1977 births
Danish men's footballers
AaB Fodbold players
AC Horsens players
Jammerbugt FC players
People from Nibe
Association football defenders
Sportspeople from the North Jutland Region